Lapérouse was a cruiser of the French Navy, lead ship of her class, named after Jean-François de Galaup, comte de Lapérouse.

Design 

Lapérouse was built at Brest, France. She was laid down in 1875 and launched in 1877. Her main armament was mounted in  barbettes.

The unarmoured cruisers of the Lapérouse class were wooden-hulled ships with iron beams. These ships had plough bows with a forecastle, a displacement of 2,363 tons, a speed of 15 knots and had a complement of 264 sailors. Armament was fifteen  M1870M guns later replaced in Primauget with Quick Firing Conversions. Each ship also had eight 1-pounder revolving cannons.

Career 

Lapérouse was part of the Far East Squadron under Admiral Amédée Courbet. On 31 July 1898, she was anchored in Fort-Dauphin's Bay at Anosy, Madagascar, waiting for coal for a voyage in which she was to provide transport for the Governor of Madagascar, General Joseph Gallieni, when a storm hit. A sudden gust of wind broke her two anchor chains, and she drifted toward the coast, ran aground, and was wrecked. All hands were saved.

Sources and references 
French navy construction drawings of the ship "LAPEROUSE, Naval construction plans".

Lapérouse-class cruisers
Ships built in France
1877 ships
Maritime incidents in 1898
Shipwrecks in the Indian Ocean
Ships sunk with no fatalities